Rome, From Mount Aventine is an 1835 painting by J M W Turner, based on drawings made by him in the city in 1828. It shows a view of the city of Rome from the Aventine Hill.

It was exhibited at the Royal Academy in 1836, where it was described by the Morning Post as "one of those amazing pictures by which Mr Turner dazzles the imagination and confounds all criticism: it is beyond praise”.

It had been commissioned from Turner by Hugh Andrew Johnstone Munro of Novar and remained in his family collection until it was bought by the 5th Earl of Roseberry in 1878. It then remained in the Roseberry collection until 2014. It was sold at Sotheby's in London on 3 December 2014 to a telephone bidder for £30.3m including buyer's premium, having had an estimate of £15-20m.

References

Paintings by J. M. W. Turner
1835 paintings
Maritime paintings